Nikos Gounaris (Zagora, 1915 – 5 May 1965 in Athens) was a Greek tenor who was enormously popular as a "pop" singer in the 1950s.

Biography

Gounaris began playing the mandolin at the age of four. He attended the musical Conservatory of Music in Athens.

Gounaris was a Greek elafró singer and among the foremost Greek composers and musicians of the 1950s and 1960s. He was especially popular in the Greek community in America. A great deal of his entertainment was at two Greek resorts in the Catskills in upstate NY, the Sunset and the Monte Carlo. He mainly sang about the sad side of love, and betrayed lovers.

Hit songs included "Ena vradi pou 'vrehe," "Glikia mou matia agapimena," and "Omorfi Athina".

He composed about 400 songs and played with the Trio Bel Canto during the 1960s. He was often called Mr. Greece.

He died on May 5, 1965 of cancer.

Famous songs
Αγάπη μου όμορφη - My beautiful love
Από τότε, την Άνοιξη - Since then, in Springtime
Αυτός ο άλλος - That other man
Γλυκά μου μάτια αγαπημένα - My sweet, beloved eyes
Είναι αργά πια τώρα να χωρίσουμε - It's too late for us to split up
Εκεί ψηλά στον Άη-Λια - On top of St Elias' hill
Ένα βράδυ που 'βρεχε - On a rainy night
Θυμήσου - Remember!
Κάϊρο - Cairo
Ο Βεδουίνος - The Bedouin
Ο κόσμος άλλαξε αλλάξαν οι καιροί - People changed, times changed
Όμορφη μου Αθήνα - Beautiful Athens
Που 'ν' αυτά τα μάτια; - Where are those eyes?
Σκαλί θα κατεβώ - I'll descend the steps
Σε είδα να κλαδεύεις - I saw you trimming the tree
Πέντε χρόνια περάσανε - Five years have passed
Τώρα που σε γνώρισα - Now that I met you

In Media
His song; Pame Sta Bouzoukia is featured in a custom map on the MMOFPS Counter-Strike titled de_plaka.

Discography
Ihografisis Stis Ipa 1958-1960 
Asteria Tou Ellinikou Tragoudiou - Gounaris 
Axehasti Epohi - Nikos Gounaris 
Ta Petalakia 
Ta Oreotera Mou Tragoudia No2 
Ta Oreotera Mou Tragoudia 
I Ellada Tou Gounari 
Back cover of LP - "Nikos Gounaris and the Trio Belcanto" (Hampshire records)

References

Sources
Biography - Nikos Gounaris  (Greek) 
 Trio Bel Canto - History
Nikos Gounaris biography on Wiki Phantis 

1915 births
1965 deaths
Greek guitarists
Greek tenors
Greek mandolin players
Greek laïko singers
Greek male singer-songwriters
20th-century Greek male singers
20th-century guitarists
People from Zagora, Greece